XXXVII (Howitzer) Brigade, Royal Field Artillery was a brigade of the Royal Field Artillery which served in the First World War.

It was originally formed with 31st, 35th and 55th (Howitzer) Batteries, each equipped with 4.5" howitzers, and attached to 4th Infantry Division. In August 1914 it mobilised and was sent to the Continent with the British Expeditionary Force, where it saw service with 4th Division until February 1915, when it was assigned to IV Corps. 55th Battery was withdrawn in May 1915, and assigned to 128th (Howitzer) Brigade. The Brigade joined the 7th Infantry Division in June 1915, and was broken up in May 1916.

On 20 August 1914 the Nominal Roll of Officers was: O.C. Brigade: Lt.Col. C. Battiscombe. Adjutant: Captain R.C. Dodgson. Orderly Officer: Lt R.B. Butler Stoney. Medical Officer: Captain Fraser RAMC. Veterinary Officer: Lt U.W.F. Walker AVC.

31st Battery: Major D,H. Gill. Captain M.C.J. Hartland-Mahon. Lt. A.G. Bates. 2Lt G.F. Simpson. 2Lt. Johnstone.

35th Battery: Major H.A. Koebel. Captain. E.A. Wallinger. Lt. M.A. Phillips. Lt. K.M. Agnew. Lt. L. Browning.

55th Battery. Major G.N. Cartwright. Captain J.R. Colville. Lt. P.H. Ferguson. 2Lt H.G. Hess. 2Lt S.H. Doake.

37th Brigade Ammunition Column: Captain H.M. Ballingall. Lt. F.H. Richards.

Officer i/c reinforcements: 2Lt H. W. Deacon.

In May 1916, the artillery brigades of infantry divisions were reorganised; the pure howitzer brigades were disbanded, and their batteries attached individually to field brigades, in order to produce mixed brigades of three field batteries and one howitzer battery. Accordingly, the brigade was broken up and the batteries dispersed; 31st (less one section) to 35th Brigade, and 35th (less one section) to 22nd Brigade.  D (H) Battery was formed for XIV Brigade, Royal Horse Artillery on 17 May 1916 with one section of 31st (H) Battery and one section of 35th (H) Battery.

A new XXVII Field Artillery Brigade was later formed in 75th Division in Egypt.

Notes

References

Bibliography

External links
Royal Field Artillery Brigades
4th Division Order of Battle

Royal Field Artillery brigades
Artillery units and formations of World War I